R. C. Pruett (born September 19, 1944) is an American politician who served as State Representative for District 19 in the Oklahoma House of Representatives.

Pruett authored the legislation that created a license to shoot black bears in four southeastern Oklahoma counties. He is also the prior owner of three supermarkets in Antlers, Broken Bow, Oklahoma and Valliant, Oklahoma.
His son, Ray Pruett, took his place in the company and now owns a chain of supermarkets.

Early life and career
Pruett was born September 19, 1944, in Houston, Texas. He attended Texas A&M University. He is married to Barbara Pruett and has three children and three grandchildren.

Political career
In 2004, he defeated Democrat John Williams in the primary, winning his party's nomination. He went on to win the general election. In 2006 and 2008 he was re-elected with no opposition. There was some speculation that he would enter the State Senate Race in 2008, but he announced that he would remain in the House.

Pruett was one of only two Democrats to serve on a special ethics committee appointed by Speaker Kris Steele in 2011.

References

External links
 Oklahoma House of Representatives

1944 births
Living people
People from Houston
Texas A&M University alumni
Democratic Party members of the Oklahoma House of Representatives
People from Antlers, Oklahoma
21st-century American politicians